Dames Basketball Club Houthalen, also known as simply Houthalen, is a Belgian women's basketball club based in Houthalen. The team plays in the Belgian Women's Basketball League.

The club was established in 2002 after it separated from BC2000 Houthalen.

References

Basketball teams established in 2002
Women's basketball teams in Belgium